Ground waves are radio waves propagating parallel to and adjacent to the surface of the Earth, following the curvature of the Earth.  This radiation is known as Norton surface wave, or more properly Norton ground wave, because ground waves in radio propagation are not confined to the surface.

Overview

Lower frequency radio waves, below 3 MHz, travel efficiently as ground waves. In ITU nomenclature, this includes (in order): medium frequency (MF), low frequency (LF), very low frequency (VLF), ultra low frequency (ULF), super low frequency (SLF), extremely low frequency (ELF) waves.

Ground propagation works because lower-frequency waves are more strongly diffracted around obstacles due to their long wavelengths, allowing them to follow the Earth's curvature. Ground waves propagate in vertical polarization, with their magnetic field horizontal and electric field (close to) vertical. 

Conductivity of the surface affects the propagation of ground waves, with more conductive surfaces such as sea water providing better propagation. Increasing the conductivity in a surface results in less dissipation. The refractive indices are subject to spatial and temporal changes. Since the ground is not a perfect electrical conductor, ground waves are attenuated as they follow the earth's surface. The wavefronts initially are vertical, but the ground, acting as a lossy dielectric, causes the wave to tilt forward as it travels. This directs some of the energy into the earth where it is dissipated, so that the signal decreases exponentially.

Applications

Most long-distance LF "longwave" radio communication (between 30 kHz and 300 kHz) is a result of groundwave propagation. Mediumwave radio transmissions (frequencies between 300 kHz and 3000 kHz), including AM broadcast band, travel both as groundwaves and, for longer distances at night, as skywaves. Ground losses become lower at lower frequencies, greatly increasing the coverage of AM stations using the lower end of the band. The VLF and LF frequencies are mostly used for military communications, especially with ships and submarines. The lower the frequency the better the waves penetrate sea water.  ELF waves (below 3 kHz) have even been used to communicate with deeply submerged submarines.

Ground waves have been used in over-the-horizon radar, which operates mainly at frequencies between 2–20 MHz over the sea, which has a sufficiently high conductivity to convey them to and from a reasonable distance (up to 100 km or more; over-horizon radar also uses skywave propagation at much greater distances). In the development of radio, ground waves were used extensively. Early commercial and professional radio services relied exclusively on long wave, low frequencies and ground-wave propagation.  To prevent interference with these services, amateur and experimental transmitters were restricted to the high frequencies (HF), felt to be useless since their ground-wave range was limited.  Upon discovery of the other propagation modes possible at medium wave and short wave frequencies, the advantages of HF for commercial and military purposes became apparent. Amateur experimentation was then confined only to authorized frequencies in the range.

Related terms

Mediumwave and shortwave reflect off the ionosphere at night, which is known as skywave. During daylight hours, the lower D layer of the ionosphere forms and absorbs lower frequency energy. This prevents skywave propagation from being very effective on mediumwave frequencies in daylight hours. At night, when the D layer dissipates, mediumwave transmissions travel better by skywave. Ground waves do not include ionospheric and tropospheric waves.

The propagation of sound waves through the ground taking advantage of the Earth's ability to more efficiently transmit low frequency is known as audio ground wave (AGW).

See also
Skywave

References

Radio frequency propagation